Centara Grand & Bangkok Convention Centre at CentralWorld is a hotel located in Pathum Wan District, Bangkok, Thailand. It is the flagship of Central Group's Centara Hotels and Resorts.

Facilities 
The hotel includes a swimming pool, choice of restaurants and bars, fitness centre, spa, jacuzzi, sauna and steam rooms, business centre, two floodlit tennis courts and indoor parking. The Bangkok Convention Centre at CentralWorld has over 10,000 square metres of function space.

The CentralWorld lifestyle and shopping mall has over 500 stores, 50 restaurants and 15 movie theatres.

See also
List of tallest buildings in Thailand

References

Hotels in Bangkok
Infrastructure completed in 2007
Central Group
Skyscrapers in Bangkok
Hotel buildings completed in 2007
Pathum Wan district
Convention centers in Thailand
Skyscraper hotels in Thailand